Valentina Bottarelli (born 12 November 1948) is a former Italian female long-distance runner and mountain runner who won at individual senior level a silver medal at the World Mountain Running Championships.

Biography
Valentina Bottarelli is the aunt of another Italian mountain runner, Sara Bottarelli.

National titles
She won a national championship at individual senior level.
Italian Mountain Running Championships
Individual: 1986

See also
 Italy at the World Mountain Running Championships

References

External links
 

1948 births
Living people
Italian female long-distance runners
Italian female marathon runners
Italian female mountain runners
20th-century Italian women
21st-century Italian women